Joshua Samuel Garnett (born February 21, 1994) is a former American football guard. He played college football for the Stanford Cardinal and was drafted by the San Francisco 49ers in the first round of the 2016 NFL Draft. He has also been a member of the Detroit Lions and  Washington Football Team.

High school career 
A native of Puyallup, Washington, Garnett attended Puyallup High School where he was a three-time all-state lineman on the football team. In his senior year, he was named 2011 South Puget Sound League Lineman of the Year. After his senior season ended, Garnett participated in the Under Armour All-America Game.

Regarded as a five-star recruit by Rivals.com, he was ranked as the No. 2 offensive guard prospect in the class of 2012, behind only Jordan Simmons. He chose Stanford over scholarship offers from Michigan and Notre Dame, among others.

College career 
As a true freshman, Garnett appeared in 14 games for the Stanford Cardinal, playing both guard positions and fullback. His first career start came against Washington State, as he became the first true freshman to start on the Cardinal's offensive line since Kirk Chambers in 2000. Stanford eventually also started freshmen Kyle Murphy and Andrus Peat on the offensive line. In his sophomore year, Garnett played another 14 games.

In his junior season, Garnett took over as left guard from David Yankey. He started 13 games on an offensive line that ranked 18th nationally in tackles for loss allowed (4.62/game), 42nd in sacks allowed (1.77/game). Garnett won the Outland Trophy as a senior in 2015.

Professional career

San Francisco 49ers

The San Francisco 49ers selected Garnett in the first round (28th overall) of the 2016 NFL Draft. On July 29, 2016, the San Francisco 49ers signed him to a four-year, 9.30 million contract.  His father, Scott, had also played for the 49ers. Garnett played in 15 games with 11 starts at guard as a rookie in the 2016 season. On September 2, 2017, he was placed on injured reserve after having knee surgery.

Garnett played in the 2018 season opener but then dislocated his toe missing 6 games afterwards. In practice on November 20, 2018, Garnett broke his thumb which sidelined him for the rest of the season. On May 2, 2019, the 49ers declined the fifth-year option on his contract before being released on August 31, 2019.

Detroit Lions
On February 3, 2020, Garnett signed a one-year contract with the Detroit Lions but was waived on August 9, 2020.

Washington Football Team 
Garnett signed with the Washington Football Team on August 21, 2020. He was waived on September 5, 2020, and was signed to the practice squad the next day. He was elevated to the active roster on September 26 and October 3 for the team's weeks 3 and 4 games against the Cleveland Browns and Baltimore Ravens, and reverted to the practice squad after each game. He was promoted to the active roster on October 9, 2020. The team announced his retirement on October 20, 2020.

References

External links 

Stanford Cardinal bio

1994 births
Living people
Sportspeople from Puyallup, Washington
Players of American football from Washington (state)
American football offensive guards
Stanford Cardinal football players
All-American college football players
San Francisco 49ers players
Detroit Lions players
Washington Football Team players